The East Kootenay is a large coal field located in the west of Canada in British Columbia. East Kootenay represents one of the largest coal reserve in Canada having estimated reserves of 8 billion tonnes of coal.

See also 
List of coalfields

References 

Coal in Canada